A by-election was held for the New South Wales Legislative Assembly electorate of Coogee on 25 June 1938 because of the death of United Australia Party member John Dunningham.

Dates

Results

See also
Electoral results for the district of Coogee
List of New South Wales state by-elections

References

1938 elections in Australia
New South Wales state by-elections
1930s in New South Wales